Aleksandr Sergeyevich Sadovnikov (born 21 September 1996) is a Russian competitive swimmer who specializes in butterfly.

He qualified for the 2016 Summer Olympics in Rio de Janeiro in the 100 meter butterfly, where he finished 8th in the final with a time of 51.84, just 0.70 seconds off of a bronze medal.

References

External links
 

1996 births
Living people
Russian male swimmers
Male butterfly swimmers
Swimmers at the 2016 Summer Olympics
Olympic swimmers of Russia
Swimmers at the 2014 Summer Youth Olympics
Universiade medalists in swimming
European Aquatics Championships medalists in swimming
Sportspeople from Volgograd
Universiade gold medalists for Russia
Universiade silver medalists for Russia
Youth Olympic gold medalists for Russia
Medalists at the 2015 Summer Universiade
Medalists at the 2017 Summer Universiade
Medalists at the 2019 Summer Universiade